Monsters (Probably) Stole My Princess is a platform game developed and published by Mediatonic for PlayStation Portable and Xbox 360 in 2010.

Reception

The PSP version received "mixed or average reviews" according to the review aggregation website Metacritic.

References

External links
 

2010 video games
Platform games
Indie video games
PlayStation Portable games
Video games developed in the United Kingdom
Xbox 360 games
Single-player video games